Staines Town Hall is a municipal building in the Market Square, Staines-upon-Thames, Surrey, England. The town hall, which briefly served as the headquarters of Spelthorne Borough Council, is a Grade II listed building.

History

The original building in the Market Square was a medieval market hall in which Sir Walter Raleigh was committed for trial in Winchester in 1603. After a decline in the use of the market hall which ultimately led to its closure in 1862, the vestry board decided to demolish the old building and to procure a new town hall.

The new building, which was financed by public subscription, was designed by John Johnson in the Renaissance style and completed in 1880. The design involved a symmetrical main frontage with five bays facing onto the Market Square; the central bay featured a porch with Tuscan order columns supporting an entablature and a balcony above; there were five round headed windows forming an arcade on the first floor with medallions in the spandrels between the windows. At roof level there were dormer windows projected out of a steep roof with a platform on which there was a clock tower with a weather vane. The clock was designed and manufactured by Gillett & Bland of Croydon. Internally, the principal rooms were the courtroom, which became known as the "Debenham Room", at the front of the building on the first floor and a full-height assembly hall, which featured a proscenium arch at the back of the building.

The building became the headquarters of Staines Urban District Council, when it was formed in 1894 and briefly remained as the local seat of government when the enlarged Spelthorne Borough Council was formed in 1974. However, its civic role ceased when the council moved to Knowle Green in 1976. The assembly hall continued to be used for concerts and public meetings and the courtroom was used for scenes in the film, Gandhi, directed and produced by Sir Richard Attenborough, which was released in 1982.

In the early 1990s, the building was converted into an arts centre which was officially opened by the actor, Kenneth Branagh, on 15 April 1994. However, the arts centre was not a commercial success and, after it closed in 1999, the building was converted into a wine bar in 2004. The wine bar was not a success either and, after changing ownership several times, it closed in 2012. Following approval of a planning application in January 2018, the building was converted into thirteen residential apartments.

References

Government buildings completed in 1880
City and town halls in Surrey
Staines-upon-Thames
Grade II listed buildings in Surrey